Gareth Sciberras (born 29 March 1983 in Pietà, Malta) is a professional footballer currently playing for Birkirkara in the Maltese Premier League, where he plays as a midfielder.

Playing career

Pietà Hotspurs
Gareth was spotted playing for the San Gwann youth team and joined Pietà Hotspurs for the 2000–01 season. Sciberras almost instantly slotted into the Pietà Hotspurs midfield, in his first season with his new club he made 18 appearances, but failed to score any goals, as Pietà Hotspurs finished in 7th position in the Maltese Premier League.

For the 2001–02 season, Gareth helped Pietà Hotspurs to another 7th-place finish in the Maltese Premier League, making 20 appearances, but again failed to score any goals.

Gareth went into the 2002–03 season, hoping to help Pietà Hotspurs to a higher league finish, which the club achieved as Pietà Hotspurs recorded a 5th-place finish in the Maltese Premier League, with Sciberras making 26 appearances, but failed to score any goals.

The 2003–04 season, was Sciberras' fourth with Pietà Hotspurs, again Gareth was heavily involved in the team's fortunes throughout the season, making 26 appearances and scoring his first two goals for the club, helping them to another 5th-place finish in the Maltese Premier League.

The 2004–05 season proved to be Gareth's last as a Pietà Hotspurs player, he helped the club to a 7th-place finish in the Maltese Premier League, making 13 appearances and scoring another two goals.

Marsaxlokk
Gareth Sciberras left Pietà Hotspurs and joined fellow Maltese Premier League team Marsaxlokk for the 2005–06 season, following an impressive season he helped his new club to their highest finish in their history, as they finished in 3rd position in Maltese Premier League, with Gareth making 12 appearances, but failing to score any goals.

The 2006–07 season proved to be the most successful season in Gareth's career. During the season, Sciberras made 25 appearances, and scored two goals, as Marsaxlokk were crowned as champions of the Maltese Premier League for the first time in the club's history.

For the 2007–08 Marsaxlokk were to some degree victims of their own success, following the previous season's triumph. The squad was weakened as many of the club's star players moved on to pastures new, this left the club short of talent, Sciberras stuck around and despite the club's loss of players, they still managed to record a very creditable 2nd-place finish in the Maltese Premier League, with Gareth making 15 appearances and scoring one goal.

Gareth went into the 2008–09 season hoping to help Marsaxlokk gain some more silverware, however the club had an extremely disappointing start to the season by their own high standards, and only managed to gain a place in the championship pool by beating Msida Saint-Joseph in the final game of the first round. Sciberras made 25 appearances, but failed to score any goals during the season. Despite the club's extremely disappointing start to the season, they managed to finish the season in 4th position in the Maltese Premier League.

For the 2009–10 season, Marsaxlokk were due to play in the Maltese Premier League, however following a guilty verdict on corruption case from the previous season, Marsaxlokk were demoted to the Maltese First Division, despite this Gareth stayed with the club.

International career

Sciberras has gained 52 caps for Malta.

On 11 December 2003, Gareth made his international debut for Malta in a friendly match against Poland; Malta lost the game 4-0. His last appearance for the Maltese national team was on 26 March 2017 in a 1-3 loss against Slovakia.

Honours

Marsaxlokk
Winner
 2006/07 Maltese Premier League
 2009/10 Maltese First Division

Birkirkara
Winner
 2012/13 Maltese Premier League

Career statistics
Statistics accurate as of match played 1 August 2012.

External links
 Gareth Sciberras at MaltaFootball.com
 

1983 births
Living people
Maltese footballers
Malta international footballers
San Gwann F.C. players
Pietà Hotspurs F.C. players
Marsaxlokk F.C. players
Birkirkara F.C. players
People from Pietà, Malta
Maltese Premier League players
Association football midfielders